Eighteen ships of the Royal Navy have borne the name HMS Eagle, after the eagle.

  was an ex-merchantman purchased in 1592 and in use as a careening hulk. She was sold in 1683.
  was a 6-gun shallop sloop, listed until 1653.
  was a 12-gun ship, previously the French ship Aigle, captured in 1650 and sold in 1655.
  was a 22-gun armed ship, previously named . She was renamed HMS Eagle in 1660, used as a fireship from 1674 and sunk as a foundation in 1694.
  was a 6-gun fireship captured from the Algerians in 1670 and expended in 1671.
  was a 6-gun fireship purchased in 1672 and foundered in 1673.
  was a 70-gun third rate launched in 1679, rebuilt in 1699 and wrecked in 1707.
  was a 10-gun advice boat launched in 1696 and wrecked in 1703.
  was a fireship sunk in 1745 as a breakwater.
  was a 58-gun fourth rate launched in 1745 and sold in 1767.
  was a 14-gun sloop launched in 1745. Her fate is unknown.
  was a 64-gun third rate launched in 1774. She was attacked by the submersible Turtle during the American Revolution, was placed on harbour service from 1790 and renamed HMS Buckingham in 1800. She was broken up in 1812.
  was a 4-gun gunvessel, formerly a Dutch hoy purchased in 1794. She was sold in 1804.
 HMS Eagle (1803) was a 12-gun gun-brig, previously the French Venteux.  captured her in 1803. The Royal Navy renamed her  in 1804 and sold her in 1807.
  was a 74-gun third rate launched in 1804. She was reduced to 50 guns in 1830 and then became a training school in 1860, being renamed  in 1918. She was lost in a fire in 1926; the wreck was sold in 1927.
The American fishing smack Yankee used a stratagem to capture Eagle on 4 July 1812.
  was an American gunboat captured at the Battle of Lake Borgne on 14 December 1814. She remained in service until at least 4 June 1815. Prize money for her and the other vessels captured at the battle was paid in July 1821.
 HMS Eagle (shore establishment) was the name of the Royal Naval Volunteer Reserve training facility at Liverpool from 1904. It was renamed  in 1918. 
  was an early aircraft carrier, converted from an unfinished Chilean battleship, launched in 1918, and sunk in 1942.
  was an Audacious-class aircraft carrier originally designated HMS Audacious, launched in 1946 and broken up in 1978.

Battle honours
Ships named Eagle have earned the following battle honours:

Portland, 1653
Gabbard, 1653
Lowestoft, 1665
Orfordness, 1666
Barfleur, 1692
Gibraltar, 1704
Velez Malaga, 1704
Ushant, 1747
Sadras, 1782
Providien, 1782
Negapatam, 1782
Trincomalee, 1782
Calabria, 1940
Mediterranean, 1940
Malta Convoys, 1942

See also

Citations and references

Citations

References

Paullin, Charles Oscar and Frederic Logan Paxson (1914) Guide to the materials in London archives for the history of the United States since 1783. (Carnegie Institution of Washington).



Royal Navy ship names